Diplatia is a genus of flowering plants belonging to the family Loranthaceae.

Its native range is New Guinea, Australia.

Species:

Diplatia furcata 
Diplatia grandibractea 
Diplatia tomentosa

References

Loranthaceae
Loranthaceae genera